The HoPWF Tag Team Championship is the top professional wrestling tag team title in the House of Pain Wrestling Federation promotion. It was created on January 20, 1998, when Gutterboy and Randy The Violator defeated Flex Fenom and Shorty Smalls in Hagerstown, Maryland. The title is defended primarily in the Mid-Atlantic and East Coast, most often in Hagerstown, Maryland, but also in Pennsylvania and West Virginia. There are 44 recognized known teams with a total of 54 title reigns.

Title history

References

Tag team wrestling championships